"The Shadow Man" is the first segment of the tenth episode from the first season (1985–86) of the television series The Twilight Zone. In this segment, a boy discovers that a murderous shadow person resides under his bed.

Plot
Danny Hayes is an intellectual child who is afraid of the dark and is the regular target of a bully named Eric. At the insistence of his mother, Danny goes to bed without the lights, television, and radio on for the first time. This allows a mysterious entity to emerge from under his bed, proclaiming "I am the Shadow Man, and I will never harm the person under whose bed I live." The Shadow Man leaves the house.

The next day, Danny tells his friend Peter about the Shadow Man but Peter dismisses it due to Danny's record of imagining horrifying things. At school, Danny hears about a series of attacks on children; witnesses describe the attacker as a shadowy man. That night, the Shadow Man again emerges, reiterates his promise, and departs. Danny unsuccessfully tries to take a photo of him.

Danny overhears that Eric's girlfriend, Lianna, needs help in algebra, and he volunteers to tutor her. She is impressed that he would risk an attack by the Shadow Man just to help her. Danny's "bravery" becomes the talk of the school and he attracts a number of friends.

As reports of the attacks accumulate, Peter begins to believe that Danny's story of the Shadow Man under his bed might be true, and says he should tell the authorities. Danny says no one would believe him. As Lianna becomes romantically interested in Danny, Eric challenges Danny to a fight. Danny convinces him they should hold the fight at night in the area where the Shadow Man has been most often sighted. At the appointed time, the Shadow Man arrives, frightening Eric away. He then begins to choke Danny, who questions why the Shadow Man is reneging on his promise of never harming him. The Shadow Man reveals that despite his similar appearance and voice, he is a Shadow Man from under someone else's bed.

Production
The segment was directed by Joe Dante, who had previously directed the third segment of Twilight Zone: The Movie. He had just come off of directing the film Explorers, so he cast Jason Presson, who played a "wrong side of the tracks" boy in that film, as the bully Eric.

The episode's ending is somewhat ambiguous, since the Shadow Man appears to be choking Danny to death, but all the earlier victims of Shadow Man attacks were only hurt, not killed. However, Dante has said that it was his intention that Danny is indeed killed by the Shadow Man.

References

External links
 

The Twilight Zone (1985 TV series season 1) episodes
1985 American television episodes

fr:L'Ombre de la nuit